Ashraf Rabie (born 16 January 1983) is an Egyptian basketball player for Al Ittihad and the Egyptian national team, where he participated at the 2014 FIBA Basketball World Cup.

References

1983 births
Living people
Egyptian men's basketball players
Power forwards (basketball)
Small forwards
African Games silver medalists for Egypt
African Games medalists in basketball
2014 FIBA Basketball World Cup players
Competitors at the 2007 All-Africa Games
Al Ittihad Alexandria Club basketball players
Gezira basketball players
Smouha SC basketball players
People from Aswan